The 1925 Lafayette Leopards football team was an American football team that represented Lafayette College as an independent during the 1925 college football season. In its second season under head coach Herb McCracken, the team compiled a 7–1–1 record. The team's victory over St. Bonaventure on October 31, 1925, marked the start of a 16-game winning streak that continued until October 15, 1927. The team was ranked No. 11 in the nation in the Dickinson System ratings released in January 1926.

Schedule

References

Lafayette
Lafayette Leopards football seasons
Lafayette Football